Los Carneros AVA (also known as Carneros AVA) is an American Viticultural Area which includes parts of both Sonoma and Napa counties in California, U.S.A. It is located north of San Pablo Bay. The proximity to the cool fog and breezes from the bay makes the climate in Los Carneros cooler and more moderate than the wine regions farther north in Napa Valley and Sonoma Valley.  The cooler climate has made Los Carneros attractive for the cultivation of cooler climate varietals like Pinot noir and Chardonnay.  Many of the grapes grown in Los Carneros are used for sparkling wine production. Receiving its AVA status in 1983, the Carneros area was the first wine region in California to be defined by its climate characteristics rather than political boundaries.

History
In the year 1942, wine producer Louis M. Martini purchased the old Stanly Ranch and began a replanting effort. By this time the Carneros region was starting to develop a reputation for the quality of the Chardonnays and Pinot noirs that came from this cool-climate region. This reputation caught the eyes of sparkling wine producers from Champagne and elsewhere. In the 1970s and continuing to this day, Francis Mahoney of Mahoney Vineyards and Fleur de California in conjunction with UC-Davis have conducted an ongoing series of clonal trials to determine the best Pinot noir grapes for the Carneros region. The 1980s saw a wave of investment and development in Los Carneros by producers such as Domaine Chandon, Domaine Carneros, Gloria Ferrer, Mumm Napa and Codorníu Napa that made Carneros one of the centers of California sparkling wine production. In the late 1980s, phylloxera returned to the Carneros region prompting extensive replanting efforts. In addition to taking advantage of better phylloxera-resistant rootstock, many Carneros producers also took the opportunity to plant some of the new French clones of Pinot noir and Chardonnay. The surging popularity of Chardonnay in the 1980s further stimulated plantings in the Carneros region. By the early 1990s, the region had over  planted.

Geography and climate

The Carneros region covers  located along the low-lying hills of the Mayacamas range as it descends underneath San Francisco Bay. The official boundaries of the AVA fall into both Napa and Sonoma counties with the largest portion being in Sonoma and entitled to use the Sonoma Valley AVA designation as well. The Napa portion of Los Carneros is similarly entitled to use the Napa Valley AVA designation. The region is moderately cool and windy with marked influences from nearby San Pablo Bay, making it the coolest and windiest AVA in both Napa & Sonoma. Early morning fog is a persistent feature.

Viticulture
The soils of the Carneros region are predominantly clay and very thin and shallow (approximately 3 feet/1 meter deep), providing poor drainage and fertility. The fierce and persistent winds coming off the bay encourages the grapevines to struggle and retain moisture. While this aids in keeping crop yields small, it can also delay the grapes from ripening sufficiently. In vintages with a long, drawn out growing season that allow the grapes to ripen, intense and vivid flavors can develop.

Grape varieties and wine

Los Carneros is primarily associated with the cool-climate wines such as Chardonnay and Pinot noir, as well as the sparkling wines made from those grapes. Many wineries in Napa & Sonoma use Carneros grapes as a cool-climate blending component. In recent years there has been interest in Merlot and Syrah coming from the warmer areas of the region. In 1996, the first possible plantings of Albarino in the United States were planted in the Carneros region.

Carneros Chardonnay is marked by its high acidity that can bring balance to the fatter, rounder Chardonnays produced in the warmer climate areas of Sonoma and Napa. While in the past, chardonnay was usually put through malolactic fermentation and was given significant oak treatment to soften some of the acidity, the current winemaking style in California emphasizes the fruit. The style now favors stainless steel and neutral French Oak, while rarely using more than a portion of the wine undergoing malolactic fermentation.

Pinot noir from the Carneros is known for its crisp acidity and tight structure and frequently exhibits spicy berry fruit. The Carneros region was one of the early pioneers of cool-climate Pinot noirs in California-long before it became a significant planting in the Russian River, Anderson Valley, Santa Rita Hills and Santa Lucia Highlands AVAs. In recent years there has been a focus by Carneros Pinot noir producers on the changing style of the region's Pinot due, in part, on emerging modern philosophies in winemaking and on clonal selections.  The older clones found in Carneros include the Martini and Swan clones which produce wines that are lighter, more elegant with some earthy complexity. They are also noted for their distinctive aromas of green herbs, beets and mint. The newer French clones being planted, (such as the Dijon 115, 667 and 777) produce more alcoholic and concentrated wines with black fruit notes.

Light brown apple moth sightings
In August 2008, two light brown apple moths were discovered in the Carneros region close to the Napa County line. The pests lay eggs on grape leaves and the resulting larvae feed on the leaves and fruit clusters, leaving them prone to rot.  Thus, their discovery caused concern that parts of the Carneros region may be quarantined just before the busy harvest season. Proposals on how to deal with the vineyard pest have been met with controversy in the past.

References

External links
 Carneros Wine Alliance

American Viticultural Areas of the San Francisco Bay Area
Geography of Napa County, California
Geography of Sonoma County, California
American Viticultural Areas
1983 establishments in California